Pezichthys is a genus in the handfish family Brachionichthyidae.

Species
The currently recognized species in this genus are:
 Pezichthys amplispinus Last & Gledhill, 2009 (Cockatoo handfish)
 Pezichthys compressus Last & Gledhill, 2009 (Narrowbody handfish)
 Pezichthys eltanani Last & Gledhill, 2009 (Eltanin handfish)
 Pezichthys macropinnis Last & Gledhill, 2009 (Longfin handfish)
 Pezichthys nigrocilium Last & Gledhill, 2009 (Eyelash handfish)

References 

Brachionichthyidae
Marine fish genera
Taxa named by Peter R. Last